Nsumoh Johnson Kalu (born 14 June 2001) is a Nigerian footballer who plays for Mosta as a winger.

Club career

Spartak Trnava
Johnson Nsumoh joined Spartak Trnava in February 2020. He made his Fortuna Liga debut for Spartak at pod Dubňom against Žilina on 14 June 2020. He came on in the second half, with the final score already set  at 2:1 for the home side, to replace Bamidele Yusuf.

He made his Mosta debut in the 2021–22 UEFA Europa Conference League qualifying, scoring against his old team Spartak Trnava.

Personal life
According to his social media communications, Nsumoh is a Christian.

References

External links
 FC Spartak Trnava official club profile 
 Futbalnet profile 
 

2001 births
Living people
People from Port Harcourt
Nigerian Christians
Nigerian footballers
Association football midfielders
FC Spartak Trnava players
Mosta F.C. players
Slovak Super Liga players
Maltese Premier League players
Nigerian expatriate footballers
Expatriate footballers in Slovakia
Nigerian expatriate sportspeople in Slovakia
Expatriate footballers in Malta
Nigerian expatriate sportspeople in Malta